Goodenia stellata is a species of flowering plant in the family Goodeniaceae and is endemic to inland areas of Western Australia. It is a low-lying to prostrate herb with elliptic to egg-shaped leaves with wavy edges, and racemes of yellow flowers.

Description
Flowering occurs from July to October and the fruit is a more or less spherical capsule  in diameter.

Taxonomy and naming
Goodenia stellata was first formally described in 1980 by Roger Charles Carolin in the journal Telopea from material he collected  from Tom Price in 1970. The specific epithet (stellata) refers to the star-shaped hairs on the foliage.

Distribution and habitat
This goodenia grows in stony soil in the Pilbara and Gibson Desert regions of inland Western Australia.

Conservation status
Goodenia stellata is classified as "not threatened" by the Government of Western Australia Department of Parks and Wildlife.

References

stellata
Eudicots of Western Australia
Plants described in 1980
Taxa named by Roger Charles Carolin
Endemic flora of Australia